The 1992 Pearl Assurance British Open was a professional ranking snooker tournament, that was held from 17 to 29 February 1992 at the Assembly Rooms in Derby, England.
 
Jimmy White won the tournament by defeating James Wattana 10–7 in the final. The defending champion Stephen Hendry was defeated in the quarter-final by Ken Doherty.


Main draw

Final

References

British Open (snooker)
British Open
British Open
British Open